Kbel is a municipality and village in Plzeň-South District in the Plzeň Region of the Czech Republic. It has about 300 inhabitants.

Administrative parts
Villages of Babice, Malinec, Mečkov and Nová Ves are administrative parts of Kbel.

Gallery

References

Villages in Plzeň-South District